The discography of Swedish girl group Play consists of five studio albums, one compilation album and eleven singles.

Albums

Studio albums

Compilation albums

Extended plays

Singles

Other appearances

Videography

Video albums

Music videos

References

Discographies of Swedish artists
Pop music group discographies